Jon Rydberg (born October 7, 1977) is a world-class American wheelchair tennis player.

Biography
Rydberg was born in Grantsburg, Wisconsin and raised in Pine City, Minnesota. He played tennis since 1992. He was a member of the 2004 United States Paralympic team that competed in Athens, Greece. In 2007, after winning gold at Parapan American Games in Brazil he became the top-ranked wheelchair tennis player in the United States. At the 2008 Summer Paralympics, he competed in both singles and doubles. In the singles event he lost in the third round to eventual gold medalist Shingo Kunieda, and in doubles he and his partner Stephen Welch were knocked out in the second round.

Also an accomplished wheelchair basketball player, Rydberg has contributed to the Rolling Timberwolves program that the Minnesota Timberwolves sponsors. He currently resides in the Twin Cities and has his own clothing line, Inc.

References

External links
 
 

1977 births
Living people
American men's wheelchair basketball players
American male tennis players
Wheelchair tennis players
Paralympic wheelchair tennis players of the United States
Wheelchair tennis players at the 2004 Summer Paralympics
Wheelchair tennis players at the 2008 Summer Paralympics
Wheelchair tennis players at the 2016 Summer Paralympics
People from Pine City, Minnesota
People from Grantsburg, Wisconsin
UT Arlington Mavericks men's wheelchair basketball players
Tennis people from Wisconsin
21st-century American people